Social animal refers to an animal which is highly interactive with other members of its species

The Social Animal, Social Animal or Social Animals  can also refer to:

The Social Animal (Aronson book), 1972 
The Social Animal (Brooks book), 2011 
 Social Animals (2018 comedy film), an American comedy film
 Social Animals (2018 documentary film), an American documentary film
 The Social Animals, an American band from Duluth

See also
Socialization
Socialization (economics)